Shanivarasanthe/Sanivarasanthe  is a small town in Kodagu district in the Indian state of Karnataka. It is one of the towns of Somwarpet taluk, in the north-east of the  district.

The main crops grown in the area are coffee, paddy, and spices.

Kannada, Kodava Takk, Tulu, Beary bashe, Hindi, and English are spoken by the people.

Flora and fauna 

Coffee and paddy are the major crop in the region. Other crops, like pepper, cardamom, ginger, and other vegetables are also grown. Also, it is famous for growing silver oak tree.

Religion and Caste 

Hindus, Muslims along with some Christians are present in this town, while the main castes are Billavas, Shettys, Vokkaligas, Lingayats, and Kodavas among the Hindus. Both Urdu and Muslim Malayalam (Byare Bashe) are spoken among the Muslims.

Notable persons 
 Field Marshal KM Cariappa, The first Indian Chief of Army Staff for the Indian Army was born here.

Places of attraction 
 Mallalli falls
 Bisle ghat
 Pushpagiri Wildlife Sanctuary
 Manjarabad Fort

See also 
 Madikeri
 Somwarpet
 Mangalore
 Virajpet
...............................................................

Villages in Kodagu district